Vitreostroma is a monotypic genus of fungi in the family Phyllachoraceae. It was listed in Outline of fungi in 2020 as having 3 known species.

But only 1 species is listed as accepted by Species Fungorum; Vitreostroma desmodii  .
As Vitreostroma desmodii subsp. asiaticum  and Vitreostroma desmodii subsp. lespedezae  are demeaned synonyms of Vitreostroma desmodii''.

References

External links 
Index Fungorum

Phyllachorales
Sordariomycetes genera